The Medford Lakes School District is a community public school district that serves students in pre-kindergarten through eighth grade from Medford Lakes, in Burlington County, New Jersey, United States.

As of the 2018–19 school year, the district, comprising two schools, had an enrollment of 514 students and 43.0 classroom teachers (on an FTE basis), for a student–teacher ratio of 12.0:1.

The district is classified by the New Jersey Department of Education as being in District Factor Group "I", the second-highest of eight groupings. District Factor Groups organize districts statewide to allow comparison by common socioeconomic characteristics of the local districts. From lowest socioeconomic status to highest, the categories are A, B, CD, DE, FG, GH, I and J.

Public school students from Medford Lakes in ninth through twelfth grades attend Shawnee High School, together with students from Medford Township, where the school is located. Shawnee is part of the Lenape Regional High School District, a regional secondary school district in Burlington County that serves the eight municipalities of Evesham Township, Medford Lakes, Medford Township, Mount Laurel Township, Shamong Township, Southampton Township, Tabernacle Township and Woodland Township at its four high schools. As of the 2018–19 school year, the high school had an enrollment of 1,597 students and 127.0 classroom teachers (on an FTE basis), for a student–teacher ratio of 12.6:1.

Awards and recognition
For the 2005-06 school year, the district was recognized with the "Best Practices Award" by the New Jersey Department of Education for its "Destination America" Social Studies program at Neeta Elementary School.

Schools
Schools in the district (with 2018–19 enrollment data from the National Center for Education Statistics) are:
Nokomis School with 151 students in Pre-K to 2nd grade
Carole Ramage, Principal
Neeta School with 363 students in grades 3-8
Anthony Dent, Principal

Administration
Core members of the district's administration are:
Anthony V. Dent, Superintendent
Michael Colling, Business Administrator / Board Secretary

Board of education
The district's board of education, with five members, sets policy and oversees the fiscal and educational operation of the district through its administration. As a Type II school district, the board's trustees are elected directly by voters to serve three-year terms of office on a staggered basis, with three seats up for election each year held (since 2012) as part of the November general election.

References

External links
Medford Lakes Public Schools

School Data for the Medford Lakes Public Schools, National Center for Education Statistics
Shawnee High School
Lenape Regional High School District

Medford, New Jersey
Medford Lakes, New Jersey
New Jersey District Factor Group I
School districts in Burlington County, New Jersey